Trichodimerol is a bio-active pentacycle isolate of Trichoderma.

References

Heterocyclic compounds with 5 rings
Trichoderma
Oxygen heterocycles